Dan Mircea Frangopol is an American civil engineer and the inaugural holder of the Fazlur R. Khan Endowed Chair of Structural Engineering and Architecture at Lehigh University, Bethlehem, Pennsylvania.

Education, career, and academic positions
Frangopol received his Diploma in Engineering from the Institute of Civil Engineering, Bucharest, Romania, in 1969 and his doctorate of Applied Sciences from the University of Liège, Belgium in 1976.

After receiving his diploma in 1969, Frangopol held a position as assistant professor at the Institute of Civil Engineering in Bucharest until 1974 when he moved to Belgium to become a Research Structural Engineer (structural reliability, analysis and design of inelastic structures, structural optimization) in the Department of Mechanics of Materials and Structural Engineering, University of Liège.

In 1977 Frangopol returned to Romania as an associate professor at the Institute of Civil Engineering in Bucharest and moved to Belgium in 1979 working as a project engineer at A. Lipski Consulting Engineers in Brussels. In March 1983 he joined the faculty of the University of Colorado at Boulder as an associate professor in the Department of Civil, Environmental and Architectural Engineering. He was promoted to full professor in 1988 and become an emeritus professor in 2006.

In 2006 he moved to Lehigh University as Professor of Civil and Environmental Engineering and the inaugural holder of the Fazlur R. Khan Endowed Chair of Structural Engineering and Architecture.

Since January 2008 he has been a Visiting Chair Professor of the National Taiwan University of Science and Technology in Taipei and since September 2009 he is an Honorary Professor at Tongji University in Shanghai. Frangopol is an experienced researcher and consultant to industry and government agencies, both nationally and abroad. His work has been funded by NSF, FHWA, ONR, NASA, USACE, AFOSR, ARDEC, NCHRP, US DOT UTC, CDOT, FDOT, PennDOT, ASCE, NATO, and by numerous other agencies including Pennsylvania Infrastructure Technology Alliance, ArcelorMittal, Modjeski and Masters, Progeny Systems Corporation, Henry Luce Foundation, U.K. Highway Agency and the Dutch Ministry of Infrastructure and Environment.

He has authored or co-authored 4 books, 64 book chapters, over 450 articles in archival journals (including 14 prize-winning papers from ASCE, IABSE, Elsevier, and EC3 (European Council on Computing in Construction), and 130 articles in ASCE journals), and more than 600 papers in conference proceedings. As of February 2023, his h-index = 97, i10-index = 456, and the total number of citations is over 34,000 (Google Scholar). Frangopol is the founding Editor-in-Chief of the peer-reviewed journal Structure and Infrastructure Engineering  and the Founding Editor of the Book Series Structures and Infrastructures.

He is a pioneer in the field of life-cycle civil and marine engineering and has been recognized as a leading educator and creator in this field. Frangopol ranked as the 10th most-cited civil engineering author in the August 2019 Stanford University worldwide citation survey published in PLOS, and ranked No.1 (Lehigh University), No.45 (United States), and No.95 (World) on April 6, 2022, by Research.com on the list of top scientists in Engineering and Technology.

In 2012, Frangopol was described by ASCE as "a preeminent authority in bridge safety and maintenance management, structural systems reliability, and life-cycle engineering. His contributions have defined much of the practice around design specifications, management methods, and optimization approaches. From the maintenance of deteriorated structures and the development of system redundancy factors to assessing the performance of long-span structures, Dr. Frangopol's research has not only saved time and money, but very likely also saved lives." and in 2020, "Frangopol's groundbreaking research into infrastructure from a holistic perspective has earned him a reputation in the civil engineering community" as the "Father of Life-Cycle Analysis.".

Honors and awards
Frangopol is a Distinguished Member of the American Society of Civil Engineers, a Member of the National Academy of Construction of the United States, an International Fellow of the Canadian Academy of Engineering, a Foreign Member of the Academia Europaea, a Foreign Associate of the Engineering Academy of Japan, a Foreign Member of the Royal Academies for Science and the Arts of Belgium, an Honorary Member of the Romanian Academy, and an Honorary Member of the Romanian Academy of Technical Sciences.

Frangopol's national and international awards include:

 Arthur M. Wellington Prize, ASCE, 2022 
 Moisseiff Award, ASCE, 2022 
 Thorpe Medal, EC3 (European Council on Computing in Construction), 2022 
 Aftab Mufti Medal for Lifetime Achievement in Civil Structural Health Monitoring, ISHMII, 2021 
 Alfred M. Freudenthal Medal, ASCE, 2020 
 Raymond C. Reese Research Prize, ASCE, 2020
 George W. Housner Structural Control and Monitoring Medal, ASCE, 2019 
 State-of-the-Art of Civil Engineering Award, ASCE, 2019
 Alfredo Ang Award (inaugural winner), ASCE, 2016 
 Civil Engineer of the Year Award, ASCE LV Section, 2016
 OPAL Lifetime Achievement Award in Education, ASCE, 2016 
 Alfred Noble Prize, ASCE, AIME, ASME, IEEE and WES, 2015 
 J. James R. Croes Medal, ASCE, 2014 
 Arthur M. Wellington Prize, ASCE, 2012 
 Fazlur R. Khan Life-Cycle Civil Engineering Medal (inaugural winner), IALCCE, 2012 
 Ernest E. Howard Award, ASCE, 2007
 OPA (Outstanding Paper Award), IABSE, 2007 
 Munro Prize, Elsevier, 2006
 T.Y. Lin Medal (inaugural winner IABMAS & T.Y. Lin International), 2006 
 Nathan M. Newmark Medal, ASCE, 2005
 State-of-the-Art of Civil Engineering Award, ASCE, 2004
 Moisseiff Award, ASCE, 2003
 J. James R. Croes Medal, ASCE, 2001
 Senior Research Prize, IASSAR, 2001
 State-of-the-Art of Civil Engineering Award, ASCE, 1998
 Distinguished Probabilistic Methods Educator Award (Inaugural winner), Society of Automotive Engineers (SAE) International, 1996

He is the Founding President of the International Association for Bridge Maintenance and Safety (IABMAS) and of the International Association for Life-Cycle Civil Engineering (IALCCE) and has held the following honorary roles: 
 Honorary President, International Association for Bridge Maintenance and Safety - Canada (2022), USA (2020), Sri Lanka (2019), Korea (2018), Turkey (2018), Chile (2017), Italy (2013), and Brazil (2013).
 Honorary Member, International Association for Bridge Maintenance and Safety - Spain (2021), Japan (2015), Australia (2014), China (2012) and Portugal (2006).
 Honorary President, International Association for Life-Cycle Civil Engineering - The Netherlands (2020)

Frangopol is the Founding Vice-President of the International Society for Structural Health Monitoring of Intelligent Infrastructure (ISHMII) and the inaugural Fellow of SEI in 2012 and EMI in 2013. He is also a Fellow of ACI, IABSE, ISHMII and JSPS.

He is the Past Chair of the Technical Activities Division of the Structural Engineering Institute of ASCE, Past Vice-President of the International Association for Structural Safety and Reliability (IASSAR), Past Chair of the Executive Board of IASSAR, and Past Vice-President of the Engineering Mechanics Institute (EMI) of ASCE.

Frangopol has been made an honorary professor by the following universities: 
 China University of Petroleum (East China), Qingdao, China, 2019
 Shenyang Jianzhu University, Shenyang, China, 2018
 Hunan University, Changsha, China, 2016
 Beijing Jiaotong University, Beijing, China, 2015
 Chongqing Jiaotong University, Chongqing, China, 2015
 Changsha University of Science and Technology, Changsha, China, 2015
 Royal Melbourne Institute of Technology (RMIT University), Melbourne, Australia, 2015
 Dalian University of Technology, Dalian, China, 2014
 Harbin Institute of Technology, Harbin, China, 2013
 The Hong Kong Polytechnic University, Hong Kong, China, 2012
 Chang'an University, Xi'an, Shaanxi, China, 2012
 Southeast University, Nanjing, China, 2011
 Tianjin University, Tianjin, China, 2011
 Tongji University, Shanghai, China, 2009

Frangopol has been awarded the degree of Doctor Honoris Causa (Honorary Doctorate) at the following universities:
 Polytechnic University of Milan (Politecnico di Milano), Milan, Italy, 2016 (Laurea ad Honorem)
 Gheorghe Asachi Technical University of Iasi, Iasi, Romania, 2014
 University of Liège, Liège, Belgium, 2008
 Technical University of Civil Engineering of Bucharest, Bucharest, Romania, 2001

His other honors include:

 Ranked No. 1 (Lehigh University), No. 45 (United States), and No. 95 (World) on April 6, 2022, by Research.com on the list of top scientists in Engineering and Technology, 2022 
 Excellence in Research Scholarship and Leadership Award, Rossin College of Engineering and Applied Science, Lehigh University, 2020
 Hillman Faculty Award, Lehigh University, 2019
 Ranked as the 10th most-cited civil engineering author in the August 2019 Stanford University worldwide citation survey published in PLOS, 2019 
 Hillmann Award for Excellence in Graduate Advising, Lehigh University, 2016
 Certificate of Appreciation in recognition of distinguished service to Engineering Mechanics Institute (EMI) as the Vice President (2014-2015) and Member of the Board of Governors (2013-2015), American Society of Civil Engineers, 2015
 Eleanor and Joseph F. Libsch Research Award, Lehigh University, 2013
 Senior Prize, International Association for Bridge Maintenance and Safety, 2012
 IALCCE Senior Award, International Association for Life-Cycle Civil Engineering, 2008
 RAE Distinguished Visiting Fellowship Award, The Royal Academy of Engineering, for Research at the University of Surrey, 2008
 IFIP Award, International Federation for Information Processing, Working Group on Reliability and Optimization of Structural Systems, 2006
 Kajima Research Award, Kajima Corporation, 2004
 Excellence in Research, Scholarly and Creative Work Award, Boulder Faculty Assembly, University of Colorado Boulder, 2004
 Clarence L. Eckel Faculty Prize for Excellence, CEAE Department, University of Colorado Boulder, 2003
 Service Award, CEAE Department, University of Colorado Boulder, 2002
 Distinguished Service Appreciation as Chair of the Technical Division Executive Committee of the Structural Engineering Institute, American Society of Civil Engineers, 2001
 Distinguished Achievement Award, CEAE Department, University of Colorado Boulder, 2000
 Faculty Research Award, College of Engineering and Applied Science, University of Colorado Boulder, 1999
 Award of Appreciation, Federal Highway Administration, 1998
 Research Development Award, CEAE Department, University of Colorado Boulder, 1998
 Research Development Award, CEAE Department, University of Colorado Boulder, 1988
 Teaching Award, CEAE Department, University of Colorado Boulder, 1987

Selected publications

References

External links
 
 International Association for Bridge Maintenance and Safety (IABMAS)
 International Association for Life-Cycle Civil Engineering (IALCCE)
 Structure and Infrastructure Engineering - International Journal (Taylor and Francis)
 Structure and Infrastructure Engineering - Book Series (Taylor and Francis)
 The Fazlur R. Khan Distinguished Lecture Series

Living people
Lehigh University faculty
Romanian emigrants to the United States
Year of birth missing (living people)
Engineering academics
American civil engineers
Technical University of Civil Engineering of Bucharest alumni
Academic staff of the Technical University of Civil Engineering of Bucharest
University of Liège alumni
University of Colorado Boulder faculty
Scientific journal editors
Members of Academia Europaea